Nephele argentifera is a moth of the family Sphingidae. It is known from coastal bush and savanna from Somalia to northern South Africa.

The larvae feed on Carissa species.

References

Nephele (moth)
Moths described in 1856
Moths of Africa
Lepidoptera of Mozambique
Insects of Somalia
Taxa named by Francis Walker (entomologist)